Miles from Home is a 2006 drama film written by, directed by and starring Ty Hodges.

Cast
Ty Hodges as Miles Conway
Meagan Good as Natasha Freeman
Stacey Meadows Jr. as Mookie
Ryan Gill as Peaches
Tasha Smith as Keisha Knight

Release
The film was released at the San Francisco Black Film Festival on June 11, 2006.

Reception
Dennis Harvey of Variety gave the film a mixed review and wrote, "...the screenplay has some sketchy aspects. But Hodges evinces a sure hand with actors and the tale’s grittier side."

Reece Pendleton of the Chicago Reader also gave it a mixed review calling it "uneven but lively" and wrote, "...it works surprisingly well, enhanced by the excellent performances and the director’s natural flair."

References

External links
 

2000s English-language films